Bras or BRAS may refer to:

 Bras, Var, a commune in the Var département of France
 Bras (surname), a surname
 "BRAS", Broadband Remote Access Server
 Bras Island, an island of Indonesia
 Le Gros Bras (Gouffre River tributary), a tributary of rivière du Gouffre in Charlevoix Regional County Municipality, Capitale-Nationale, Quebec, Canada

See also 
 Bra, or brassiere, a woman's undergarment
 Quatre Bras (disambiguation)
 Fortinbras
 Petrobras